The Paxman Viper is a Canadian homebuilt aircraft that was designed by Elbert Paxman and produced by Paxman's Northern Aircraft of Glenwood, Alberta, introduced in 1994. When it was available the aircraft was supplied as a kit for amateur construction.

Design and development
The Viper was designed for the Canadian advanced ultralight category. It features a cantilever low-wing, a two-seats-in-side-by-side configuration enclosed cockpit under a bubble canopy, fixed conventional landing gear and a single engine in tractor configuration.

The aircraft airframe is made from wood, covered in doped aircraft fabric.

The manufacturer estimated the construction time from the supplied kit as 500 hours.

Operational history
By 1998 the company reported that one kit had been sold, was completed and flying.

In January 2014 one example was registered with Transport Canada.

Specifications (Viper)

References

External links
Photo of the prototype Viper on display at Oshkosh, 1996

Viper
1990s Canadian sport aircraft
1990s Canadian ultralight aircraft
1990s Canadian civil utility aircraft
Single-engined tractor aircraft
Low-wing aircraft
Homebuilt aircraft